Miha Pirih (born March 10, 1978, in Jesenice) is a Slovenian rower who represented Slovenia at three consecutive Summer Olympics, starting in 2000.

References
 sports-reference

1978 births
Living people
Slovenian male rowers
Olympic rowers of Slovenia
Rowers at the 2000 Summer Olympics
Rowers at the 2004 Summer Olympics
Rowers at the 2008 Summer Olympics
Sportspeople from Jesenice, Jesenice
21st-century Slovenian people